Peter "Pedro" Brown Hoffmeister is an American author, poet, and rock climber. His books include Too Shattered For Mending, This Is The Part Where You Laugh, The End of Boys, Let Them Be Eaten By Bears – A Fearless Guide To Taking Our Kids into The Great Outdoors, Graphic the Valley, and Confessions of the Last Man On Earth Without A Cell Phone. He has also written for Climbing Magazine, Rock and Ice, Vice, Climbing.com, Gripped Magazine, Ampheta'Zine, and the Huffington Post. He was a 2006 recipient of the Oregon Literary Arts Fellowship for Fiction. He has worked as a rock climbing and whitewater rafting guide, and currently teaches literature, outdoor pursuits, and survival in Eugene, Oregon.

Works
The End of Boys, a memoir (Soft Skull Press, 2011)
Let Them Be Eaten By Bears – A Fearless Guide To Taking Our Kids into The Great Outdoors (Penguin, 2013)
Graphic the Valley (Simon & Schuster, Gallery Books, Tyrus Books, 2013)
This Is The Part Where You Laugh (Knopf, Random House, 2016)
Too Shattered For Mending, (Knopf, Random House, 2017)
Confessions of the Last Man On Earth Without A Cell Phone: Rants, Lists, And Worthless Opinions (Amazon, KDP, 2018)

Awards and recognition
 Hoffmeister's novels have earned starred reviews from Kirkus Reviews, Booklist, Publishers Weekly, School Library Journal, VOYA, and The Bulletin.
 His novel This Is The Part Where You Laugh was a School Library Journal Popular Pick, selected for the "VOYA Perfect Tens 2016" year-end list, and earned an American Library Association distinction for "Best Fiction For Young Adults."

Rock climbing and outdoor athlete
 Hoffmeister has more than 50 first ascents in Oregon.
 He has written for Climbing Magazine, Rock & Ice, and Gripped.
 He is a sponsored outdoor athlete and ambassador for Ridgemont Outfitters and Elevation Bouldering Gym.

Race against Hans Florine
On May 18, 2019, Hoffmeister raced professional rock climber and world-record holder for most El Capitan ascents Hans Florine in a NIAD ("Nose In A Day" – 3000 feet of rock climbing in one day). The race was titled "Super Local vs. Super Pro," and took place at The Columns, Skinner's Butte Park, in Eugene, Oregon. Both climbers were coming back from devastating injuries. Hoffmeister had the advantage of knowing all of the routes. Florine did not know the routes but is one of the greatest speed climbers of all time. Hoffmeister won the race, climbing 3000 feet, 64 routes, in 2:05:55. Florine clocked 2:27:05 .

Albums
"The Great American Afterlife" – with Mankind (Art/Sound Recordings, 2012)

References

Writers from Oregon
Living people
Place of birth missing (living people)
Year of birth missing (living people)
American male writers